Derakht-e Senjed is a village in Bizaki Rural District, Golbajar District, Chenaran County, Razavi Khorasan Province, Iran. At the 2006 census, its population was 44, in 11 families.

References 

Populated places in Chenaran County